Jerry Reed Hubbard (March 20, 1937 – September 1, 2008) was an American singer, guitarist, composer, songwriter and actor who appeared in more than a dozen films. His signature songs included "Guitar Man", "U.S. Male", "A Thing Called Love", "Alabama Wild Man", "Amos Moses", "When You're Hot, You're Hot" (which garnered a Grammy Award for Best Country Vocal Performance, Male), "Ko-Ko Joe", "Lord, Mr. Ford", "East Bound and Down" (the theme song for the 1977 film Smokey and the Bandit, in which Reed co-starred), "The Bird", and "She Got the Goldmine (I Got the Shaft)".

Reed was inducted into the Musicians Hall of Fame and Museum.

Reed was announced as an inductee into the Country Music Hall of Fame in April 2017; he was officially inducted by Bobby Bare on October 24.

Early life
Reed was born in Atlanta and was the second child of Robert and Cynthia Hubbard. Reed's grandparents lived in Rockmart and he would visit them from time to time. As a small child running around strumming his guitar he is quoted as saying "I am gonna be a star. I'm gonna go to Nashville and be a star." Reed's parents separated four months after his birth; he and his sister spent seven years in foster homes or orphanages growing up. Reed was reunited with his mother and stepfather in 1944.

Reed graduated from O'Keefe High School, an Atlanta city school. The O'Keefe building still exists today; it was sold to Georgia Tech and is now part of the university's campus. By high school, Reed was already writing and singing music, having learned to play the guitar as a child. At age 18, he was signed by publisher and record producer Bill Lowery to cut his first record, "If the Good Lord's Willing and the Creek Don't Rise".

At Capitol Records Reed was promoted as a new "teen-age sensation" after recording his own rockabilly composition "When I Found You" in 1956. He recorded both country and rockabilly singles and found success as a songwriter when label mate Gene Vincent covered his song "Crazy Legs" in 1958.

By 1958, Bill Lowery signed Reed to his company, National Recording Corporation. He recorded for NRC as both an artist and as a member of the staff band which included Joe South and Ray Stevens, other NRC artists.

Reed married Priscilla "Prissy" Mitchell in 1959. They had two daughters, Seidina Ann Hubbard, born April 2, 1960, and Charlotte Elaine (Lottie) Zavala, born October 19, 1970. Mitchell was a member of folk group The Appalachians ("Bony Moronie", 1963), and with Roy Drusky was co-credited on the 1965 country No. 1 "Yes, Mr. Peters".

Career
In 1959, Reed hit the Billboard "Bubbling Under the Top 100", also known as the Roar and Cashbox Country chart with the single "Soldier's Joy". After serving two years in the United States Army, Reed moved to Nashville in 1961 to continue his songwriting career, which had continued to gather steam while he was in the Army, thanks to Brenda Lee's 1960 cover of his song "That's All You Got to Do". He also became a popular session and tour guitarist. In 1962, he scored some success with two singles "Goodnight Irene" (as by Jerry Reed & the Hully Girlies, featuring a female vocal group) and "Hully Gully Guitar", which found their way to Chet Atkins at RCA Victor, who produced Reed's 1965 "If I Don't Live Up to It".

"Guitar Man"
In July 1967, Reed had his best showing on the country chart (No. 53) with his self-penned "Guitar Man", which Elvis Presley soon covered. Reed's next single was "Tupelo Mississippi Flash", a comic tribute to Presley. Recorded on September 1, the song became his first Top 20 hit, going to No. 15 on the chart. Coincidentally Presley came to Nashville to record nine days later on September 10, 1967, and one of the songs he became especially excited about was "Guitar Man".

Reed recalled how he was tracked down to play on the Presley session: "I was out on the Cumberland River fishing, and I got a call from Felton Jarvis (then Presley's producer at RCA Victor) He said, 'Elvis is down here. We've been trying to cut "Guitar Man" all day long. He wants it to sound like it sounded on your album.' I finally told him, 'Well, if you want it to sound like that, you're going have to get me in there to play guitar, because these guys [you're using in the studio] are straight pickers. I pick with my fingers and tune that guitar up all weird kind of ways.'"

Jarvis hired Reed to play on the session. "I hit that intro, and [Elvis's] face lit up and here we went. Then after he got through that, he cut [my] "U.S. Male" at the same session. I was toppin' cotton, son." Reed also played the guitar for Elvis Presley's "Big Boss Man" (1967), recorded in the same session.

On January 15 and 16, 1968, Reed worked on a second Presley session, during which he played guitar on a cover of Chuck Berry's "Too Much Monkey Business", "Stay Away", and "Goin' Home" (two songs revolving around Presley's film Stay Away, Joe), as well as another Reed composition, "U.S. Male" (Reed's quoted recollection of "U.S. Male" being recorded at the same session as "Guitar Man" being incorrect).

Presley also recorded two other Reed compositions: "A Thing Called Love" in May 1971 for his He Touched Me album, and "Talk About The Good Times" in December 1973, for a total of four.

Johnny Cash also released "A Thing Called Love" as a single in 1971. It  reached No. 2 on the Billboard Country Singles Chart for North America and was also successful in Europe. It became the title track for a studio album that he released the following spring.

1970s
After releasing the 1970 crossover hit "Amos Moses", a hybrid of rock, country, funk, and Cajun styles which reached No. 8 on the U.S. pop chart, Reed teamed with Atkins for the duet LP Me & Jerry, which earned the pair the Grammy Award for Best Country Instrumental Performance. During the 1970 television season, he was a regular on The Glen Campbell Goodtime Hour, and in 1971 he released his biggest hit, the chart-topper "When You're Hot, You're Hot", which is a story song with most of the lyrics being spoken rather than sung. The song concerns the singer's near success at shooting dice, a police raid, and a judge who is supposedly a fishing buddy of the singer, who nevertheless sends him up the river for gambling. Aside from being a major crossover hit, "When You're Hot, You're Hot" earned Reed the Grammy Award for Best Country Vocal Performance, Male.

"When You're Hot, You're Hot" was the title track of Reed's first solo album, reaching No. 9 Pop and No. 6 on Billboard's Easy Listening chart. The singles from the album, "Amos Moses" and "When You're Hot, You're Hot" sold over one million copies, and were awarded gold discs by the RIAA The album features songs such as Reed's version of "Ruby, Don't Take Your Love to Town" and John D. Loudermilk's free-wheeling song "Big Daddy (Alabama Bound)".

A second collaboration with Atkins, Me & Chet, followed in 1972 as did a series of Top 40 singles which alternated between frenetic, straightforward country offerings and more pop-flavored, countrypolitan material. A year later he scored his second number one single with "Lord, Mr. Ford" (written by Deena Kaye Rose), from the album of the same name.

Atkins, who frequently produced Reed's music, remarked that he had to encourage Reed to put instrumental numbers on his own albums, as Reed always considered himself more of a songwriter than a player. Atkins, however, thought Reed was a better fingerstyle player than he was himself; Reed, according to Atkins, helped him work out the fingerpicking for one of Atkins's biggest hits, "Yakety Sax". Reed was one of only five people to have the title of Certified Guitar Player (an award bestowed only to those who have completely mastered guitar) and Chet Atkins gave him the title.

Reed was featured in animated form in a December 9, 1972, episode of Hanna–Barbera's The New Scooby-Doo Movies, "The Phantom of the Country Music Hall" (prod. No. 61-10). He sang and played the song "Pretty Mary Sunlight". The song is played throughout the episode as Scooby and the gang search for Reed's missing guitar.

In the mid-1970s, Reed's recording career began to take a back seat to his acting aspirations. In 1974, he co-starred with his close friend Burt Reynolds in the film W.W. and the Dixie Dancekings. While he continued to record throughout the decade, his greatest visibility was as a motion picture star and almost always in tandem with headliner Reynolds; after 1976's Gator, Reed appeared in 1978's High-Ballin' and 1979's Hot Stuff. He also co-starred in all three of the Smokey and the Bandit films; the first, which premiered in 1977, landed Reed a No. 2 hit with the soundtrack's "East Bound and Down".

In 1977, Reed joined entrepreneur Larry Schmittou and other country music stars including Conway Twitty, Cal Smith, Larry Gatlin, and Richard Sterban, as investors in the Nashville Sounds, a minor league baseball team of the Double-A Southern League that began play in 1978.

He made two guest appearances on the sitcom Alice, in 1978 and 1981.

When asked whom he considered the best actor, Burt Reynolds credited Reed.

Reed also took a stab at hosting a TV variety show, filming two episodes of The Jerry Reed Show in 1976.

Scottish rockers The Sensational Alex Harvey Band released a version of "Amos Moses" in 1976.

In 1979, he released a record comprising both vocal and instrumental selections titled, appropriately enough, Half & Half. It was followed one year later by Jerry Reed Sings Jim Croce, a tribute to the late singer/songwriter. He also starred in a TV movie in that year entitled Concrete Cowboys.

1980s and 1990s
In January 1980, Reed began work on the "Guitar Man" re-recording being produced by Presley's producer Felton Jarvis. With a new "hopped up" guitar line and Presley on lead vocals, the song reached number one on the country chart.

In 1982, Reed's career as a singles artist was revitalized by the chart-topping hit "She Got the Goldmine (I Got the Shaft)", followed by "The Bird", which peaked at No. 2. His last chart hit, "I'm a Slave", appeared in 1983. In the same year he co-starred with Robin Williams and Walter Matthau in the Michael Ritchie comedy The Survivors. Reed guest-starred in the October 13, 1983, episode of Mama's Family, "The Return of Leonard Oates" (Episode 13, Season 2), as Naomi Harper's ex-husband.

He accepted an invitation to open for the British group Dexys Midnight Runners in the US in 1984, yet left the tour early to appear on the country music comedy TV show Hee-Haw.

After an unsuccessful 1986 LP, Lookin' at You, Reed focused on touring until 1992 when he and Atkins reunited for the album Sneakin' Around before he again returned to the road. In the meantime, Reed appeared in several interviews and commercial spots for Mid-South Wrestling.

Reed had a role as a commander/Huey pilot for Danny Glover's character in the 1988 movie Bat*21 starring Gene Hackman. He also acted as executive producer and screenwriter on this film.

Reed starred in the 1998 Adam Sandler film The Waterboy as Red Beaulieu, the movie's chief antagonist and the head coach for the University of Louisiana Cougars football team.

He teamed up with country superstars Waylon Jennings, Mel Tillis, and Bobby Bare in the group Old Dogs. They recorded one album in 1998, entitled Old Dogs, with songs written by Shel Silverstein. Reed sang lead on "Young Man's Job" and "Elvis Has Left The Building", the latter possibly in deference to Elvis helping launch his career.

In 1998, the American rock band Primus covered the Reed song "Amos Moses" on the EP titled Rhinoplasty.

2000s
In October 2004, "Amos Moses" was featured on the Grand Theft Auto: San Andreas soundtrack which played on the fictional radio station K-Rose. In 2007, the British band Alabama 3 (known as A3 in the U.S.) covered his hit "Amos Moses" on their album, M.O.R.

In June 2005, American guitarist Eric Johnson released his album Bloom which contained a track titled "Tribute to Jerry Reed" in commemoration of his works.

Reed appeared as a guest on the fishing television series Bill Dance Outdoors. In one memorable appearance, Reed caught a particularly big largemouth bass and planned to have it preserved and mounted by a taxidermist. Host Bill Dance objected to this plan and freed the fish when Reed was not looking. Reed became enraged when he discovered what had happened and chased Dance off the boat and to shore. This incident was mentioned in one of Jeff Foxworthy's stand-up comedy routines.

"She Got the Goldmine (I Got the Shaft)" was used in the 2010 film, The Bounty Hunter. It plays during the scene where Milo (Gerard Butler) searches Nicole's (Jennifer Aniston) apartment.

"You Took All the Ramblin' Out of Me" was used in the 2013 video game Grand Theft Auto V, on the radio station Rebel Radio.

"Talk About the Good Times" was used as the opening theme for the 2022 streaming TV series Sprung in all but the first episode.  The entire song closed the final episode.

Personal life and death
Reed married country singer Priscilla Mitchell on July 9, 1959; they had two daughters (Seidina Ann Hubbard, born April 2, 1960, and Charlotte Elaine (Lottie) Zavala, born October 19, 1970) who also became country singers.

Reed died in Nashville on September 1, 2008, of complications from emphysema at the age of 71. A week later during their debut at the Grand Ole Opry, Canadian country rock group The Road Hammers performed "East Bound and Down" as a tribute. In a tribute in Vintage Guitar Magazine, Rich Kienzle wrote that "Reed set a standard that inspires fingerstyle players the way Merle and Chet inspired him." He was survived by Mitchell and their two daughters. Mitchell died following a short illness on September 24, 2014, at the age of 73.

Reed was a heavy smoker for many years. Thom Bresh, son of Merle Travis and a close friend of Reed's, produced a 1990s video with Reed acting out his desire to quit smoking the addictive cigarettes ("Jerry Reed - Another Puff", which was his first 1972 released single) that serves as a public service video from Reed on the dangers of smoking cigarettes.

Style and influences

CMT called Jerry Reed "a genuine original who helped take country music and the country lifestyle to a larger mainstream audience." Reed's "influence on American guitar playing is held by some to be comparable to that of Django Reinhardt, and several of his songs have become country rock standards", according to The Guardian. Rock Guitar For Dummies described Reed as one of the great rockabilly musicians. Reed's syncopated guitar playing style was influenced by Merle Travis and Earl Scruggs; this style was nicknamed the "claw", due to the appearance of Reed's hand as he played. Reed's guitar playing also showed the influence of the blues. Reed was also influenced by comedians, saying that he admired them as much as musicians. Reed's vocal performances on some of his singles were also described as a prototype to rap vocals. Rapper Cowboy Troy said that Charlie Daniels and Jerry Reed's vocal delivery "was called recitations at that time, but if you listened to it now, you'd probably call it a rap". Brad Paisley said that he was influenced by Reed's "overall artistry and persona", as well as "his total musicianship [...] anyone who picks a country guitar knows of his mastery of the instrument [...] [Reed was] one of the most inspirational stylists in the history of country music.”

Accolades
Country Music Association
1970 CMA Instrumentalist of the Year
1971 CMA Instrumentalist of the Year

Grammy Awards
1971 Best Country Instrumental Performance - with Chet Atkins for Me & Jerry
1972 Best Country Vocal Performance, Male - When You're Hot, You're Hot
1993 Best Country Instrumental Performance - with Chet Atkins for Sneakin' Around

Discography

Filmography

References

Further reading

External links

Jerry Reed  at the Rockabilly Hall of Fame
Jerry Reed retrospective in Awaiting the Flood

1937 births
2008 deaths
Deaths from emphysema
American male film actors
American male singer-songwriters
American country singer-songwriters
American male guitarists
American rock singers
American rockabilly guitarists
Country Music Hall of Fame inductees
Fingerstyle guitarists
Musicians from Atlanta
Grammy Award winners
National Recording Corporation artists
RCA Records Nashville artists
Capitol Records artists
20th-century American singers
20th-century American guitarists
Guitarists from Georgia (U.S. state)
20th-century American male actors
Country musicians from Georgia (U.S. state)
20th-century American male singers
Old Dogs members
Singer-songwriters from Georgia (U.S. state)